David James "Doody" Townley (29 June 1925 – 28 March 1999) was a driver of Standardbred racehorses in New Zealand. He was associated with many champions and was a leading driver of harness horses in New Zealand.

He is notable for winning four Inter Dominion Championships, the premier trotting series of races between Australia and New Zealand. Not surprisingly, he is also an inductee in the Inter Dominion Hall of Fame. Doody also won two Auckland Trotting Cups and the New Zealand Trotting Cup. These are the two top races in New Zealand.

Townley died in Ashburton on 28 March 1999, and his ashes were buried at Ashburton Cemetery.

Big race wins
 1980 Inter Dominion Trotting Championship Hano Direct
 1971 Inter Dominion Pacing Championship Stella Frost
 1971 New Zealand Trotting Cup True Averil
 1970 Auckland Trotting Cup Stella Frost
 1968 Inter Dominion Trotting Championship Stylish Major
 1966 Auckland Trotting Cup Waitaki Hanover
 1965 Inter Dominion Pacing Championship Robin Dundee
 1962 Great Northern Derby Tactile
 1959 Great Northern Derby Sun Chief

See also

 Harness racing in New Zealand

References

1925 births
1999 deaths
New Zealand harness racers
Inter Dominion winners